Manuel Suárez (born 5 December 1989) is a Cuban rower. He competed in the men's lightweight double sculls event with Yunior Perez at the 2012 Summer Olympics.

References

1989 births
Living people
Cuban male rowers
Olympic rowers of Cuba
Rowers at the 2012 Summer Olympics
Sportspeople from Havana
Pan American Games medalists in rowing
Pan American Games gold medalists for Cuba
Pan American Games silver medalists for Cuba
Rowers at the 2011 Pan American Games
Rowers at the 2015 Pan American Games
Medalists at the 2011 Pan American Games
Medalists at the 2015 Pan American Games